Suda is a rural locality (a settlement) and the administrative center of Sudskoye Rural Settlement, Cherepovetsky District, Vologda Oblast, Russia. The population was 5,692 as of 2002. There are 71 streets.

Geography 
Suda is located 39 km west of Cherepovets (the district's administrative centre) by road. Bolshoye Novo is the nearest rural locality.   suda is a stream in Sanskrit

References 

Rural localities in Cherepovetsky District